Hotel Laack is a historic three-story building in Plymouth, Wisconsin. It was built as a hotel for businessman Henry Christopher Laack in 1892, and designed in the Queen Anne style by architect Charles Hilpertshauser. The son of a German immigrant, Laack first built houses and commercial buildings in Plymouth, including a Gothic Revival structure behind the hotel in 1889. When Laack built the Hotel Laack three years later, he already owned Commercial House, another hotel and saloon. The building has been listed on the National Register of Historic Places since December 2, 1985.

References

1892 establishments in Wisconsin
Hotel buildings completed in 1892
National Register of Historic Places in Sheboygan County, Wisconsin
Queen Anne architecture in Wisconsin